Jetsun Dragpa Gyaltsen (1147–1216) was a Tibetan spiritual leader and the third of the Five Sakya Patriarchs (sa skya gong ma rnam lnga) of Tibet. He was also the guru of the famous Sakya Pandita.

See also
Simhamukha

References

External links
 grags pa rgyal mtshan (P1614) — TBRC
 himalayanart.org: Teacher: Dragpa Gyaltsen (Lama)
 hhthesakyatrizin.org: Jetsun Dragpa Gyaltsen

Sakya Trizins
1147 births
1216 deaths
12th-century Tibetan people
13th-century Tibetan people
12th-century lamas
13th-century lamas